The 2015–16 Kosovo Basketball Superleague season was the 22nd season of the Kosovo Basketball Superleague, the highest professional basketball league in Kosovo. The season started on October 3, 2015, and ended on May 18, 2016. 

Two days before the new season, Kastrioti decided to leave the league due to financial problems so the league will remain with 7 teams for this season. Sigal Prishtina was the defending champion.

Venues and locations

Notes

 Promoted from the 2014–15 Liga e Parë.
 Promoted via Wild Card (see 2014–15 season)

Arena standards
This season, the facilities of the clubs participating in Kosovo Basketball Superleague and hosting the home matches, must have a minimum capacity of 1,000 people.

Regular season

Playoffs

Finals

|}

1st leg

2nd leg

Awards
MVP:  Drilon Hajrizi– KB Peja
Finals MVP:  Dardan Berisha – Sigal Prishtina
Foreigner MVP:  Jason Washburn – Sigal Prishtina
Coach of the Year:  Antonis Constantinides – Sigal Prishtina

External links
 Official website of Kosovo Basketball Superleague

References

Kosovo Basketball Superleague seasons
Kosovo
2015–16 in Kosovan basketball